Mississauga Centre is a provincial electoral district in Ontario, Canada, that was represented in the Legislative Assembly of Ontario from 1999 to 2007, and again from 2018 to present.

This riding was originally created in 1996 from parts of Mississauga East and Mississauga West ridings. Throughout its brief existence, it was represented by Rob Sampson and Harinder Takhar.  It consisted of the central part of the City of Mississauga, Ontario.  The electoral district was abolished in 2003 when it was redistributed between Mississauga East—Cooksville, Mississauga South, Mississauga—Brampton South and Mississauga—Erindale ridings.

For the 2018 election, it was re-created from Mississauga East—Cooksville, Mississauga—Erindale, Mississauga—Brampton South, and Mississauga—Streetsville.

Members of Provincial Parliament

Demographics
According to the Canada 2011 Census; 2013 representation

Ethnic groups: 32.8% White, 26.4% South Asian, 11.6 Chinese, 6.6% Filipino, 6.4% Arab, 5.0% Black, 2.6% Southeast Asian, 2.4% Latin American, 1.3% Korean, 1.3% West Asian 
Languages: 42.9% English, 9.8% Chinese, 6.0% Urdu, 5.7% Arabic, 3.4% Tagalog, 3.1% Polish, 2.9% Portuguese, 2.8% Punjabi, 2.6% Spanish, 1.8% Hindi, 1.7% Tamil, 1.7% Vietnamese, 1.5% Italian, 1.4% French, 1.2% Gujarati, 1.0% Persian, 1.0% Korean
Religions: 52.9% Christian (33.8% Catholic, 4.0% Christian Orthodox, 2.2% Anglican, 1.5% United Church, 1.3% Pentecostal, 1.3% Baptist, 1.2% Presbyterian, 7.6% Other), 16.5% Muslim, 8.9% Hindu, 2.9% Buddhist, 2.8% Sikh, 15.2% No religion 
Median income (2010): $27,738 
Average income (2010): $36,502

Election results

2018 - present

1999 - 2007

See also 
 List of Ontario provincial electoral districts

References

External links 
 Elections Ontario  1999 results and 2003 results
 Map of riding for 2018 election

Former provincial electoral districts of Ontario
Politics of Mississauga
Ontario provincial electoral districts